Giant beaver may refer to:
 Castoroides, an extinct Pleistocene genus of beavers from North America
 Trogontherium, an extinct Pleistocene genus of beavers from Eurasia

Animal common name disambiguation pages